Harry Weiss may refer to:

 Harry Houdini (1874–1926), famous magician and escape artist also known as Harry Weiss
 Harry Weiss (philatelist) (1888–1966), American writer about stamps
 Hermann Weiss (1909–?), Austrian ice hockey goaltender